Jean René Weissmann (2 January 1930 – 28 October 1986) was a French boxer. He competed in the men's light welterweight event at the 1952 Summer Olympics.

References

External links
 

1930 births
1986 deaths
French male boxers
Olympic boxers of France
Boxers at the 1952 Summer Olympics
Sportspeople from Strasbourg
Light-welterweight boxers